The Reel World String Band is an all-women American roots music band from Kentucky. Their first record was released in 1981.

Feminism
In 1991, band members Karen Jones and Bev Futrell had a radio show, 'Wominsounds' which was broadcast through Central and Eastern Kentucky from the Eastern Kentucky University in Richmond. The two-hour show was focused on music, readings, and announcements of events for women.

Band members
In March, 2016, George Ella Lyon, Silas House, and the Reel World String Band gathered at the University of Kentucky to celebrate the donation of the Kentucky female band's archives to the university and to honor the 30th anniversary of the Kentucky Foundation for Women. Reel World also performed at Lexington's Lyric Theater.

Discography and compilations
 The Reel World String Band, 1981
 Long Way to Harlan, 1982
 In Good Time, 1984
 They'll Never Keep Us Down: Women's Coal Mining Songs, 1984
 Appalachian Wind, circa 1988
 whatnots, 1996
 The Coast is Clear, 2001  Mountain Song: Reflections, 2002
 Live Music, 2005
 Music of Coal Mining Songs from the Appalachian Coalfields, 2007

References

External links
 Official website

Feminist musicians
Musical groups from Kentucky